The Sumatran tiger is a population of Panthera tigris sondaica on the Indonesian island of Sumatra. It is the only surviving tiger population in the Sunda Islands, where the Bali and Javan tigers are extinct.

Sequences from complete mitochondrial genes of 34 tigers support the hypothesis that Sumatran tigers are diagnostically distinct from mainland subspecies. In 2017, the Cat Classification Task Force of the Cat Specialist Group revised felid taxonomy and recognizes the living and extinct tiger populations in Indonesia as P. t. sondaica.

Taxonomy

Felis tigris sondaicus was the scientific name proposed by Coenraad Jacob Temminck in 1844 for a tiger specimen from Java.

Panthera tigris sumatrae was proposed by Reginald Innes Pocock in 1929, who described a skin and a skull of a tiger zoological specimen from Sumatra.
The skull and pelage pattern of tiger specimens from Java and Sumatra do not differ significantly.
P. t. sondaica is therefore considered the valid name for the living and extinct tiger populations in Indonesia.

Evolution 
Analysis of DNA is consistent with the hypothesis that Sumatran tigers became isolated from other tiger populations after a rise in sea level that occurred at the Pleistocene to Holocene border about 12,000–6,000 years ago. In agreement with this evolutionary history, the Sumatran tiger is genetically isolated from all living mainland tigers, which form a distinct group closely related to each other. The isolation of the Sumatran tiger from mainland tiger populations is supported by multiple unique characters, including two diagnostic mitochondrial DNA nucleotide sites, ten mitochondrial DNA haplotypes and 11 out of 108 unique microsatellite alleles. The relatively high genetic variability and the phylogenetic distinctiveness of the Sumatran tiger indicates that the gene flow between island and mainland populations was highly restricted.

Characteristics 

The Sumatran tiger was described based on two zoological specimens that differed in skull size and striping pattern from Bengal and Javan tiger specimens. It is darker in fur colour and has broader stripes than the Javan tiger. Stripes tend to dissolve into spots near their ends, and on the back, flanks and hind legs are lines of small, dark spots between the regular stripes. The frequency of stripes is higher than in other subspecies.
Males have a prominent ruff, which is especially marked in the Sumatran tiger.

The Sumatran tiger is one of the smallest tigers.

Distribution and habitat 
About a third of these patches are inside protected areas.

They use non-forest habitats and human-dominated landscapes at the fringes of protected areas to a lesser degree.

In 1978, the Sumatran tiger population was estimated at 1,000 individuals, based on responses to a questionnaire survey. In 1985, a total of 26 protected areas across Sumatra containing about 800 tigers were identified. In 1992, an estimated 400–500 tigers lived in five Sumatran national parks and two protected areas. At that time, the largest population unit comprised 110–180 individuals in Gunung Leuser National Park.
As of 2011, the tiger population in Kerinci Seblat National Park in central Sumatra comprised 165–190 individuals, which is more than anywhere else on the island. The park has the highest tiger occupancy rate of Sumatra's protected areas, with 83% of the park showing signs of tigers.

Sumatra's total tiger population was estimated at 618 ± 290 individuals in 2017.

Ecology and behaviour 

Sumatran tigers strongly prefer uncultivated forests and make little use of plantations of acacia and oil palm even if these are available. Within natural forest areas, they tend to use areas with higher elevation, lower annual rainfall, farther from the forest edge, and closer to forest centres. They prefer forest with dense understory cover and steep slope, and they strongly avoid forest areas with high human influence in the forms of encroachment and settlement. In acacia plantations, they tend to use areas closer to water and prefer areas with older plants, more leaf litter, and thicker subcanopy cover. Tiger records in oil palm plantations and rubber plantations are scarce. The availability of adequate vegetation cover at the ground level serves as an environmental condition fundamentally needed by tigers regardless of the location. Without adequate understory cover, tigers are even more vulnerable to persecution by humans. Human disturbance-related variables negatively affect tiger occupancy and habitat use. Variables with strong impacts include settlement and encroachment within forest areas, logging, and the intensity of maintenance in acacia plantations.
Camera trapping surveys conducted in southern Riau revealed an extremely low abundance of potential prey and a low tiger density in peat swamp forest areas. Repeated sampling in the newly established Tesso Nilo National Park documented a trend of increasing tiger density from 0.90 individuals per  in 2005 to 1.70 individuals per  in 2008.

Threats 

Major threats include habitat loss due to expansion of palm oil plantations and planting of acacia plantations, prey-base depletion, and illegal trade primarily for the domestic market.

Tigers need large contiguous forest blocks to thrive. Between 1985 and 1999, forest loss within Bukit Barisan Selatan National Park averaged 2% per year. Lowland forest disappeared faster than montane forest, and forests on gentle slopes disappeared faster than forests on steep slopes. Most forest conversions resulted from agricultural development, leading to predictions that by 2010, 70% of the park will be in agriculture. Camera-trap data indicated avoidance of forest boundaries by tigers. Classification of forest into core and peripheral forest based on mammal distribution suggests that by 2010, core forest area for tigers will be fragmented and reduced to 20% of the remaining forest.

Sumatra's largest tiger population in Kerinci Seblat National Park is threatened by a high rate of deforestation in its outer regions. Drivers are an unsustainable demand for natural resources created by a human population with the highest rate of growth in Indonesia, and a government initiative to increase tree-crop plantations and high-intensity commercial logging, which ultimately leads to forest fires. The majority of the tigers found in the park were relocated to its center where conservation efforts are focused, but issues in the lowland hill forests of the outskirts remain. While being a highly suitable tiger habitat, these areas are also heavily targeted by logging efforts, which substantially contributes to declines in local tiger numbers.

The expansion of plantations is increasing greenhouse gas emissions, playing a part in anthropogenic climate change, thus further adding to environmental pressures on endangered species. Climate-based movement of tigers northwards may lead to increased conflict with people. From 1987 to 1997, Sumatran tigers reportedly killed 146 people and at least 870 livestock. In West Sumatra, Riau, and Aceh, a total of 128 incidents were reported; 265 tigers were killed and 97 captured in response, and 35 more tigers were killed from 1998 to 2002. From 2007 to 2010, the tigers caused the death of 9 humans and 25 further tigers were killed.

In 1997, an estimated 53 tigers were killed by poachers and their parts sold throughout most of northern Sumatra. Numbers for all of Sumatra are likely to be higher. Farmers killed many of the tigers to prevent livestock losses. They sold them to gold and souvenir shops, and pharmacies. In 2006, wildlife markets were surveyed in 28 cities and nine seaports in seven Sumatran provinces; 33 of 326 retail outlets offered tiger parts like skins, canines, bones, and whiskers. Tiger bones fetched the highest average price of US$116 per kg, followed by canines. There is evidence that tiger parts are smuggled out of Indonesia.

In 2013–2014, Kerinci Seblat National Park experienced an upsurge in poaching, with the highest annual number of snare traps being removed for a patrol effort similar to previous years. Evidence is scarce and misunderstood on whether the strategies implemented to diminish poaching are succeeding despite the investment of millions of dollars annually into conservation strategies.

Conservation 

Panthera tigris is listed on CITES Appendix I. Hunting is prohibited in Indonesia.

In 1994, the Indonesian Sumatran Tiger Conservation Strategy addressed the potential crisis that tigers faced in Sumatra. The Sumatran Tiger Project (STP) was initiated in June 1995 in and around the Way Kambas National Park to ensure the long-term viability of wild Sumatran tigers and to accumulate data on tiger life-history characteristics vital for the management of wild populations. By August 1999, the teams of the STP had evaluated 52 sites of potential tiger habitat in Lampung Province, of which only 15 were intact enough to contain tigers. In the framework of the STP, a community-based conservation programme was initiated to document the tiger-human dimension in the park to enable conservation authorities to resolve tiger-human conflicts based on a comprehensive database rather than anecdotes and opinions.

In 2007, the Indonesian Forestry Ministry and Safari Park established cooperation with the Australia Zoo for the conservation of Sumatran tigers and other endangered species. The program includes conserving Sumatran tigers and other endangered species in the wild, efforts to reduce conflicts between tigers and humans, and rehabilitating Sumatran tigers and reintroducing them to their natural habitat.
Indonesia's struggle with conservation has caused an upsurge in political momentum to protect and conserve wildlife and biodiversity. In 2009, Indonesia's president committed to substantially reduce deforestation, and policies across the nation requiring spatial plans that would be environmentally sustainable at national, provincial, and district levels.

Between 2005 and 2015, about US$210 million have been invested into tiger law-enforcement activities that support forest ranger patrols, as well as the implementations of front-line law-enforcement activities by the Global Tiger Recovery Plan, which aims to double the number of wild tigers by 2020.
In November 2016, Batu Nanggar Sanctuary was opened in North Padang Lawas Regency, North Sumatra
for conservation of Sumatran wildlife.

An interview survey among 600 consumers revealed that most were willing to pay consistently more for a "tiger-friendly" produced good if this product would be conducive to Sumatran tiger conservation.

In captivity 

As of 2013, about 375 captive Sumatran tigers were listed in the global studbook and management plan, with 50 of them housed in 14 zoos in Australia and New Zealand. All of them were offspring of 15 founders. Fourteen cubs showed congenital vestibular system dysfunctions such as ataxia, strabismus, nystagmus, head tilting and falling that resolved when they were two years old. The cause for this disorder is most likely their close genetic relation and inbreeding.

See also 

 Tiger populations
 Mainland Asian populations
 Bengal tiger
 Caspian tiger
 Indochinese tiger
 Malayan tiger
 Siberian tiger
 South China tiger
 Sunda island populations
 Bali tiger
 Bornean tiger
 Javan tiger

References

External links 

  and 
 
 
 Overweight captive Sumatran tiger at the National Zoological Park (United States)
 Indonesia races to catch tiger alive as villagers threaten to ‘kill the beast’

Fauna of Sumatra
Critically endangered fauna of Asia
Mammals described in 1929
Sumatran tiger